George Arthur (23 February 1925 – 28 March 1990) was an Australian soccer player who played for Wallsend Football Club and Australia.

Playing career
Arthur began his senior career with Merewether at the age of 17. He later joined Wallsend where he played over 400 first grade appearances and served as captain. He later had stints with Lysaghts Orb and Blacksmiths Rangers. 

Arthur was a member of the Australian team at the 1956 Summer Olympics. The Sydney Morning Herald called his performance in his debut against Japan "outstanding", noting that he was a surprise selection for the team. After Australia's elimination against India in their second match, Arthur only played once more for the national team, a post-Olympics friendly match against India in December 1956.

References

1925 births
1990 deaths
Australian soccer players
Footballers at the 1956 Summer Olympics
Olympic soccer players of Australia
Association football wing halves
Australia international soccer players